Lim Soo-hyang (born April 19, 1990) is a South Korean actress. She rose to fame playing leading roles in the television series New Tales of Gisaeng (2011) and Inspiring Generation (2014). After a series of supporting roles, she gained wide recognition for her performances in the campus romance My ID is Gangnam Beauty (2018) and the smash-hit mystery drama Graceful Family (2019). She then starred in When I Was the Most Beautiful (2020), Woori the Virgin (2022), and Doctor Lawyer (2022).

Career

2011–2017: New Tales of Gisaeng and diverse roles
After making a bit-part appearance in the 2009 film 4th Period Mystery while she was still a student at Chung-Ang University, Im landed her breakthrough role when she was cast as Dan Sa-ran, a prideful, lower-middle class dancer, in the 2011 popular television series New Tales of Gisaeng. Cast alongside Sung Hoon and Han Hye-rin, the series explored the premise that the gisaeng, the Korean equivalent of a geisha or courtesan, still existed in modern-day Korea. Im was nominated for several newcomer awards for her performance and won the SBS Drama Award for Best New Star and the Korea Drama Award for Best New Actress. That same year, she had a prominent supporting role in Paradise Ranch and made a cameo appearance in Salamander Guru and The Shadows.

To develop her range, Im increased her profile with starring roles as diverse as a feisty chairman's daughter in I Do, I Do (2012), a cool assassin in Iris II: New Generation (2013),  the calculating stepdaughter of a high official in Inspiring Generation (2014), a college dropout in Five Enough (2015) and the female antagonist in Blow Breeze (2015). In 2016, Im played the title character in the prison romance film Eunha.

In 2017, Im was cast in the leading role of a widowed policewoman in Lovers in Bloom, for which she received a KBS Drama Award for Best Actress in a Daily Drama. Also that year, she made a cameo appearance as a serial killer who pretends to be a victim in tvN's crime procedural drama Criminal Minds, based on the American series of the same name.

2018–present: My ID is Gangnam Beauty and rising popularity
In 2018, Im rose in popularity when she starred opposite Cha Eun-woo of Astro in the JTBC romantic comedy series Gangnam Beauty. For her performance as Kang Mi-rae, Im won the Top Excellence Award for Actress in a Drama at the 26th Korea Culture and Entertainment Awards.

In 2019, Im received critical acclaim for her portrayal of Mo Seok-hee, a confident, charismatic and savage chaebol heiress, in the mystery drama Graceful Family. The series premiered with high viewership ratings for MBN network and attracted media attention in Korea and internationally. In 2020, Im next starred in the romance melodrama When I Was the Most Beautiful opposite Ji Soo and Ha Seok-jin, portraying an optimistic ceramic artist who falls in love with two brothers. Im was again praised for her acting and she went on to gain the Top Excellence prize at the 39th MBC Drama Awards.

In 2022, she played the titular role of Oh Woo-ri in the SBS romantic comedy drama Woori the Virgin based on American series Jane the Virgin, reuniting with New Tales of Gisaeng co-star Sung Hoon. The same year she starred in the MBC medical-legal drama Doctor Lawyer in the role of a prosecutor. Later in July, Im joined the 'Bubble for Actors' platform.

Philanthropy 
On March 16, 2023, Im donated sanitary napkins for vulnerable women through the NGO G Foundation.

Filmography

Film

Television series

Television shows

Discography

Singles

Awards and nominations

Notes

References

External links

 Im Soo-hyang at FN Entertainment
 
 

People from Busan
South Korean television actresses
South Korean film actresses
1990 births
Living people
Chung-Ang University alumni